The 910s decade ran from January 1, 910, to December 31, 919.

Significant people
 Al-Ash'ari
 Al-Muqtadir Abbasid caliph
 Leo VI of Byzantium

References